Events from the year 1825 in Russia

Incumbents
 Monarch – Alexander I (until December 1), Nicholas I (after December 1)

Events

 Third Section of His Imperial Majesty's Own Chancellery
 December 1 (November 19 O.S.) – Nicholas I of Russia succeeds his brother Alexander I.
 December 26 (December 14 O.S.) – 3000 Imperial Russian Army officers stage the Decembrist Revolt against Nicholas's accession in Saint Petersburg. The rebellion, however, is successfully suppressed by the government.

Births

Deaths
 - Alexander I of Russia (b. 1777)
 - Count Mikhail Miloradovich, Russian general of Serbian origin, prominent during the Napoleonic Wars. (b. 1771)

References

1825 in Russia
Years of the 19th century in the Russian Empire